Barja (also known as Barja al-Chouf) is a town and municipality in the Chouf District of the Mount Lebanon Governorate in Lebanon. Barja is situated near the Mediterranean coast, 34 kilometers south of Beirut and at the midway point between the latter and Sidon. The town's total land area consists of 729 hectares and its highest point above sea level is documented at 310 meters. Barja had 12,888 registered voters in 2010, and eleven schools with a total of 2,788 students in 2006. Its inhabitants are predominantly Sunni Muslims.

History

Caves and monuments

Close to the northern entrance of the Barja, a few dozens of caves and burial cemeteries can be seen carved out inside of rocks hills, which dates back to the Neolithic period. 

The urban expansion has destroyed a lot of it but some paintings and engravings and remains of a population that lived in this region can still be found from time to time, such as Mesopotamia, Persians, Greece, Romans and Byzantines.

When the French Renan mission visited Phenicia in 1863, it described Barja as the “buried city - Necropole”. Residents of Barja has also seen this expedition taking back to the French consulate in Beirut a monument bearing a Greek inscription. “Khorstos Al-Sharif Salam, he left prematurely, lived 27 years, died in 228. On the twentieth month of Theseus month. 

In the modern age, that area is called by “Qasr bu Hanin", attributed to the name of the landowner.

The castle of Al-Nawawais, next to a college building, which overlooks the valley of a town named "Siblin", is wrongfully called “Ajran El-Dibs”, but in fact, it is Nawawais, which means sarcophaguses, originally made for Phoenician priests and other of pagan peoples.
 
They are all engraved in rocky hills, with a depth of no more than 40 cm, on a high plateau, which would be closer to the gods.

Twentieth century
The name Barja is originally derived from the ancient Greek word 'Taparchia', which means 'cultural center', and the Syriac word 'Burgas', which means 'a series of hills overlooking the sea'.

Built during the middle of the 20th century, Barja was renowned for its fertile soil, spring waters, limestone and gravel resources, as well as its strategic location along the coast of Lebanon. Early economic activities included fishing, farming, and light textile manufacturing.

During the  Lebanese Civil War (1975-1990), hundreds of young men and women emigrated from Barja to various countries such as Australia, Brazil, the United States, Canada, and the United Kingdom, contributing to the Lebanese diaspora. With the strong support of scholarships from the Rafic Hariri Foundation, these Barja youth were able to pursue higher education and doctoral degrees from a variety of overseas universities.

Contemporary period
The town features antique houses originally built near fresh spring waters that demonstrate traditional architecture. The high street, Al-Ain Avenue, is located between three large hills and overlooks the Mediterranean Sea. It hosts a traditional Souk called 'Zak Zouk', several local restaurants, a popular barber called 'Mounib', and commercial shopping facilities.

Since the turn of the millennium, Barja has experienced rapid westernization. The introduction of telecommunication services such as the internet, mobile phones, and television has contributed to an overall development in the social and economic welfare of locals. The new generation have embraced modern lifestyles and experience new methods of entertainment such as going to cinemas, listening to western music and playing video games.

As public transportation and mass transit become more abundant, locals are commuting to the capital city Beirut in search for job opportunities. Most Barja residents who live in the capital city return to their hometowns during weekends. However, the rising costs of food and fuel remain a major barrier against the economic growth and development of Barja locals.

Climate
Barja enjoys mild Mediterranean climate during summer and winter seasons, as average temperatures vary between 11 - 27 °C. The town is home to pine groves, olive tree orchards, and a variety of outdoor recreational areas.

Much of the town was destroyed during a devastating earthquake that shook the Chouf District in 1956. However, over the past 50 years the remains of the earthquake have been gradually concealed beneath a layer of modern building development.

References

Populated places in Chouf District
Sunni Muslim communities in Lebanon